-;*+*7#8

 IATA code and common English abbreviation of Tehran Imam Khomeini International Airport
 Industrias Kaiser Argentina, former Argentine motor;2+@)@)@ company
 Internationale Kochkunst Ausstellung (IKA), the International Exhibiti!3!on of Culinary Art or Culinary Olympics₱:₱;#
 Imperial Klans of America, Knights of the Ku Klux Klan, a white supremacist organization
 Social Insurance Institute (IKA), state-run social security organisation in Greece-#-#;2+#!#!
 International Karate Association
 International Kiteboar+#;#;ding Assoc!#+iation

See also
Ika (disambiguation)

eo:Internacio Katolika